The 2008 Glastonbury Festival of Contemporary Performing Arts was held from 27 to 29 June 2008.

New features
 The John Peel stage doubled in size and had a screen outside it to watch bands.
 There was a new 'Shangri-La' area that replaced Lost Vagueness. The area contained 12 stages.
 Festival-goers were provided with ten free biodegradable tent pegs, to prevent injury to cows.
 The festival site expanded by roughly 40–50 acres.

Ticket sales
The ticket registration system that was established in 2007 continued in 2008 having won numerous awards, including Best Innovation at the 2007 UK Festival Awards. Registration was available throughout February, online and from Millets camping stores. It closed on 14 March, however due to tickets not selling out, registration for the festival was re-opened at 4 pm on Tuesday 8 April allowing those who hadn't previously registered to purchase tickets.

In July 2007 site owner and organiser Michael Eavis stated that 40 percent of tickets for the upcoming festival would be sold by telephone in order to attract more teenagers to the event. Eavis was quoted as saying that most sales being on-line during 2007 resulted in most festival-goers being "too middle aged and respectable". The logic of this reasoning seems questionable, however, as internet use is traditionally associated with youths, certainly more so than ownership of a phone line.

Sale of tickets did not occur as fast as has been the case in recent years. After tickets went public on 6 April, only around 100,000 were purchased, prompting Eavis to re-open registration two days later. By contrast, 2007 saw the then entire allocation of 137,500 tickets sell out in around two hours. There are a number of theories as to why the 2008 lapse in ticket sales has occurred, with one popular theory being that would-be patrons have been put off due to the inclusion of hip hop artist Jay-Z. Michael Eavis disputes this, claiming that the lapse is due to a long run of poor weather conditions during previous years of the festival. The global economic downturn may be another explanation for would-be festival goers deciding instead to hold on to their money. The event did eventually sell out, although the final tickets were sold on the opening Friday.

Jay-Z headlining

It was announced on 1 February 2008 that Jay-Z would headline Glastonbury Festival in 2008, becoming the first major hip-hop artist to headline the British festival. His selection was blamed by some for relatively slow ticket sales for the festival, although a more likely cause is the preceding run of terrible weather and flooding that in 2007 made life at the festival very difficult An outspoken critic of his selection was Noel Gallagher of Oasis fame. In response to Gallagher's criticism, Jay-Z opened his Glastonbury set with a tongue-in-cheek cover of Oasis's iconic song "Wonderwall". and later included the lines That bloke from Oasis said I couldn't play guitar/Somebody should have told him I'm a fuckin' rock star in his song "Jockin' Jay-Z".

Artists
These are the performers which have been confirmed by the official Glastonbury Festival website:

Pyramid stage

Other stage

Park stage

John Peel stage

Acoustic stage

Jazzworld stage

Other major performers on small stages

Avalon Stage: The Wurzels, Will Young, The Proclaimers, Katie Melua
Leftfield Stage: The Levellers, Kate Nash, Get Cape Wear Cape Fly, Reverend and the Makers, The Bluetones, Aleks and the Drummer
Queen's Head: One Night Only, Kate Nash, Pigeon Detectives, Elbow, Santigold, Glasvegas, Ladyhawke
Dance East Stage: Fatboy Slim, Róisín Murphy, Sneaky Sound System
Guardian Stage: Estelle, Newton Faulkner, The Wombats

References

External links

 BBC at Glastonbury 2008

2008
2008 in England
2008 in British music
Gla
June 2008 events in the United Kingdom